Jean Danet (14 January 1924 – 15 October 2001) was a French actor. He appeared in 27 films between 1942 and 1983.

Danet was born in Auray, Brittany, France. Following World War II, he began work in films. He founded Tréteaux de France in 1959. Danet died in Paris.

Filmography
Signé illisible (1942) Clément
Journal d'un curé de campagne (1951) Olivier
 Deburau (1951) Armand Duval
Capitaine Ardant (1951) Idjilla
Mon curé chez les riches (1952) Le vicomte Pierre de Sableuse
La Putain respectueuse (1952) Un client du night-club
Deux de l'escadrille (1953)
La nuit est à nous (1953) Alain Brécourt
 The Adventurer of Chad  Alain de Blomette
Si Versailles m'était conté (1954) Boufflers (uncredited)
Les révoltés de Lomanach (1954) de Varadec
Napoléon (1955) (uncredited) Le général Gourgaud
Ça va barder (1955) Diego
La rue des bouches peintes (1955) Jack Morgan
Bel Ami (1955)
Pasión en el mar (1956) Jorge
La foire aux femmes (1956) Jean-Pierre
Notre-Dame de Paris (1956) Phoebus de Chateaupers
La garçonne (1957) Lucien Vigneret
Si le roi savait ça (1958) Marcellin
Le joueur (1958) Marquis des Grieux
Vive Henri IV... vive l'amour! (1961) Concino Concini
Dossier 1413 (1962) Gilles Cauvin
Pour Vermeer (1973) Arsène
Le double assassinat de la rue Morgue (1973) Le préfet
Don Juan (1978) Dom Luis, le père de Don Juan
Les trois mousquetaires ou L'escrime ne paie pas (1979) Richelieu
Le grand carnaval (1983) Colonel Raoul de Vigny

References

External links

1924 births
2001 deaths
French male film actors